The Philippine five-centavo coin (5¢) coin is the second-lowest denomination coin of the Philippine peso after the one centavo.

History

Pre-independence 

No coin worth 1/20 of a peso circulated during the Spanish rule of the Philippines, when the 10 centimo coin was the lowest denomination of the Philippine peso fuerte. The Mexican 5-centavo (1/20th peso) silver coin, however, was accepted in the Philippines for the same value.

The first five centavo was minted in 1903, the first year of minting during the American rule of the country, gained after the Spanish–American War. The coin's images were identical to those of the half-centavo and one centavo coin.

The obverse featured a native with a volcano in the distance, with the coin's denomination above him, and the inscription 'Filipinas' underneath. The reverse featured the American coat of arms, and had the inscription 'United States of America' circling it. The year of issue was underneath the coat of arms.

The last minting of this first coin was in 1928.  A smaller version was minted between 1930 and 1935. In 1937 the coat of arms was changed to a Philippine one and this coin was issued until 1945

Independence

English Series 
In 1958, minting of the centavo resumed with another coat of arms on the reverse. The inscription around the coat of arms was changed to 'Central Bank of the Philippines'.

Pilipino Series 
In 1969, the coin featured the Tagalog language for the first time. Its obverse featured Melchora Aquino in profile to the right, a Filipina revolutionary who became known as "Tandang Sora" (English: "Elder Sora") because of her age and her contributions. The inscription around the shield read 'Republika ng Pilipinas'.

Ang Bagong Lipunan Series 
A second eight-pointed scallop edge coin featuring Aquino was minted from 1975 to 1983. The name of the Republic was moved to the obverse, and Aquino now faced the left. On the reverse read the inscription 'Ang Bagong Lipunan'. The issues from 1979 to 1982 featured a mintmark underneath the five centavo.

Flora and Fauna Series 
From 1983 to 1993, the coin was now round and silver in color, Aquino again faced the right in profile, and the denomination was moved to the reverse with the date on the front.

BSP Coin Series 
Issued from 1995, the five centavo coin is minted in copper-plated steel, and featured no subject presented. The obverse side contained the denomination, the name of the republic and its year of issue. The reverse side featured the 1993 logo of the Bangko Sentral ng Pilipinas. Due to its low buying power, (an exchange rate in November 2014 gives it a value of 0.0011 USD, 0.0007 GBP, 0.000878 EUR, 0.031 THB, or 267 Uzbek tiyin ) the coin is commonly used as a keyring decoration or as a washer due to its hole.

New Generation Currency Coin Series 
Issued in 2018, this issue depicts the stylized representation of the Philippine flag, the three stars and the sun, the name of the republic, denomination and its year of issue on the obverse. The reverse features the Kapal-kapal Baging (Hoya pubicalyx) flower and the current logo of the Bangko Sentral ng Pilipinas.

Version history

References

Currencies of the Philippines
Five-cent coins